Cigaritis mozambica, the Mozambique bar or Mozambique silverline, is a butterfly of the family Lycaenidae. It is found in tropical Africa. In South Africa it is found from the coast of KwaZulu-Natal to the Drakensberg, then to Eswatini, the Free State, Gauteng, Mpumalanga, Limpopo and North West provinces.

The wingspan is 22–25 mm for males and 25–28 mm for females. Adults are on wing year-round with peaks in late summer.

The larvae feed on Sphenostylis angustifolia. They are associated with ants of the genus Crematogaster.

References

External links
Die Gross-Schmetterlinge der Erde 13: Die Afrikanischen Tagfalter. Plate XIII 69 e,f

Butterflies described in 1850
Cigaritis